Hassan Benabicha (born 15 April 1964) is a Moroccan football manager and former player.

Biography
Benabicha played several years for Wydad Casablanca and is counted among the club's most emblematic players. Once his playing career completed, Benabicha managed numerous Moroccan teams, including FAR Rabat, Kawkab Marrakesh and JS Massira.

In 2008, Benabicha was appointed as caretaker manager for Kawkab Marrakech. In April 2010, he took charge of the Moroccan U18 national team. In 2011, Benabicha became the head coach of Morocco's U20 team, which he temporarily left to manage Morocco's local players in the 2014 African Nations Championship taking place in South Africa. The team left the competition in the quarter-finals following a 4–3 defeat to Nigeria.

After head coach Rachid Taoussi's dismissal, Benabicha became Morocco's interim manager. He led the team in a friendly match against Gabon in Marrakesh, which ended in a 1–1 draw. Benabicha left the position in 2014. He was eventually replaced by 1986 African Footballer of the Year and former Morocco player Badou Ezzaki, who most notably led the national team to the final of the 2004 African Cup of Nations.

Honours

As manager
Morocco U20
Mediterranean Games: 2013
Islamic Solidarity Games: 2013
Jeux de la Francophonie runner-up: 2013
Toulon Tournament runner-up: 2015

References

External links

1964 births
Living people
People from Khemisset
Moroccan footballers
Association football midfielders
Morocco international footballers
1988 African Cup of Nations players
Wydad AC players
Botola players
Moroccan football managers